Lombard Street is a main thoroughfare in North and Northeast Portland, Oregon. It serves as a boundary and main commercial street for several North Portland neighborhoods.

Route description

Lombard Street begins at the entrance to Kelley Point Park, near the confluence of the Columbia and Willamette Rivers. From here, it crosses the Columbia Slough and briefly runs southwest before turning south, serving as a primary industrial arterial. It then crosses above a railroad junction which serves that industrial area, briefly continues as Burgard Road, then turns southeast and continues again as Lombard. It passes Schnitzer Steel and Pier Park before continuing into Downtown St. Johns as the main commercial street. At the end of that section, it crosses an intersection with Richmond Avenue, at which point it takes over the U.S. Route 30 Bypass (US 30 Byp.) designation. Lombard continues as a primarily commercial street through several neighborhoods (listed below).

Lombard turns slightly as it passes Columbia Park and continues east. It crosses Interstate Avenue (OR 99W). It then passes over Interstate 5 (I-5), providing access to the freeway via a half-cloverleaf interchange. Next, it crosses OR 99E (Martin Luther King, Jr. Boulevard), at which point it becomes a primarily industrial thoroughfare, employing interchanges for all but one of its four-way crossings. At its intersection with NE 10th Avenue, it turns southeast and continues until its intersection with NE 46th Avenue, at which point the street's designation as Lombard ends and it continues as NE Portland Highway.

Neighborhoods and districts served

 Rivergate Industrial District, from the Columbia Slough to Burgard Road.
 St Johns, including the Rivergate Industrial District, to the North Portland Railroad Cut.
 Portsmouth, from the North Portland Railroad Cut to N Chautauqua Boulevard, serving as the neighborhood's southern boundary.
 University Park, from the North Portland Railroad Cut to N Chautauqua Boulevard, serving as the neighborhood's northern boundary.
 Kenton, from N Chautauqua Boulevard to Interstate 5 (I-5), serving as the neighborhood's southern boundary.
 Arbor Lodge, from N Chautauqua Boulevard to Interstate 5 (I-5), serving as the neighborhood's northern boundary.
 Piedmont, from Interstate 5 (I-5) to NE Martin Luther King Jr. Boulevard.
 Woodlawn, from NE Martin Luther King Jr. Boulevard to NE 22nd Avenue.
 Concordia, from NE 22nd Avenue to NE 42nd Avenue.
 Cully, from NE 42nd Avenue to Lombard's connection to NE Portland Highway.

Transportation

Several radial TriMet bus lines serve portions of Lombard Street.
 Line 4 runs between Downtown Portland and St. Johns with stops on two segments of Lombard: between N St. Louis and N Richmond Avenue, and between N Denver and N Albina Avenue. It provides a connection to the MAX Yellow Line at the North Lombard Transit Center.
 Line 16 runs between Downtown Portland and Sauvie Island, with stops on Lombard between N St. Louis and N Richmond Avenue.
 Line 35 runs between Oregon City and University of Portland, with stops on Lombard between N Portsmouth Avenue and N Greeley Avenue.
 Line 44 runs between Portland Community College's Sylvania campus and Pier Park, with stops on Lombard between the park and N Richmond Avenue.
 Line 75 runs between Milwaukie and St. Johns, with stops on Lombard from Pier Park to N Williams Avenue. It also provides a MAX connection at the North Lombard Transit Center.

History

Lombard Street holds several different historical names because of North Portland's history as a series of smaller communities that were annexed by Portland. In Kenton and Albina, it was named Pippin Street. In Portsmouth, it was named Dawson Street. As the main street of St. Johns' commercial core, it was named Jersey Street.

Historically, Lombard Street was home to a large segment of streetcar line 474, which ran from Albina to St. Johns between 1888 and 1937. The Kenton Stockyard line also traveled up a portion of Lombard between 1909 and 1928.

Rail still exists under the asphalt in some parts of the street, including some slated for removal by the Portland Bureau of Transportation in plans for the N Lombard Main Street renewal project.

Events
The St. Johns Parade has been held annually for over 50 years, and uses Lombard between N Burr Avenue and Downtown St. Johns as the main part of its route.

Notable landmarks

 Kelley Point Park
 Pier Park
 St. Johns Twin Cinema, built 1913
 James John Elementary School, built 1929
 St. Johns Signal Tower Gas Station, built 1939
 John Yeon Speculative House, built 1939
 Columbia Park
 De La Salle North Catholic High School

References

North Portland, Oregon
Northeast Portland, Oregon
Streets in Portland, Oregon
Transportation in Multnomah County, Oregon
U.S. Route 30